Anglo-Norse may refer to:

The Anglo-Norse Society in London
, a number of ships